The women's 53 kilograms weightlifting event at the 2012 Summer Olympics in London, United Kingdom, took place at ExCeL London on 29 July.

Summary
Total score was the sum of the lifter's best result in each of the snatch and the clean and jerk, with three lifts allowed for each lift.  In case of a tie, the lighter lifter won; if still tied, the lifter who took the fewest attempts to achieve the total score won.  Lifters without a valid snatch score did not perform the clean and jerk.

The original gold medalist, Zulfiya Chinshanlo of Kazakhstan was disqualified from the Games on 27 October 2016, and her medal, results and records stripped. Re-analysis of Chinshanlo’s samples from London 2012 had resulted in a positive test for the prohibited substances oxandrolone and stanozolol, both anabolic steroids.

Schedule
All times are British Summer Time (UTC+01:00)

Records

Results

New records

References 

Results 

Weightlifting at the 2012 Summer Olympics
Olymp
Women's events at the 2012 Summer Olympics